Tomb TT193, located in the necropolis of El-Assasif in Thebes, Egypt, is the tomb of Ptahemheb, who was a magnate of the seal in the treasury of the Estate of Amun during the Nineteenth Dynasty of Egypt. Ptahemheb's tomb is part of the TT192 tomb complex. A stele from the tomb is located in the courtyard of the tomb of Kheruef (TT192)

Ptahemhab had a wife named Tadewert.

See also
 List of Theban tombs

References

Theban tombs